Pearling in Western Australia includes the harvesting and farming of both pearls and pearl shells (for mother of pearl) along the north-western coast of Western Australia.

The practice of collecting pearl shells existed well before European settlement. Coastal dwelling Aboriginal people had collected and traded pearl shell as well as trepang and tortoise with fisherman from Sulawesi for possibly hundreds of years.  After settlement, Aboriginal people were used as slave labour in the emerging commercial industry in a practice known as blackbirding.  Pearling centred first around Nickol Bay and Exmouth Gulf and then around Broome, to become the largest in the world by 1910.

The farming of cultured pearls remains an important part of the Kimberley economy, worth  million in 2014 and is the second largest fisheries industry in Western Australia after rock lobster.

History

The first stage of the European pearling industry: Wading for shell  
Pearls were first gathered in Western Australia by Aboriginal Australians. The European pearling industry began in the 1850s at Shark Bay where pearls (called the  'Oriental, or Golden' Pearl)  were found in the Pinctada albina oyster in relatively large numbers. The industry soon folded however.

At Nickol Bay, decorative pearl shells (Riji) made by local Aborigines from Pinctada maxima, were noted by European explorers. The industry began in the mid-1860s with pastoral workers who collected shell in shallow waters, either from shore or in small boats.

During the late 1860s many more boats left Fremantle and the pearling industry at Torres Strait, Queensland for the new fishery at Nickol Bay with its port of Tien Tsin Harbour (later known as Cossack). 

While Broadhurst and a few other proprietors experimented, during the 1860s, with the use of breathing apparatus by professional divers, it proved at the time to be expensive, unreliable and dangerous.

While local Aborigines were excellent swimmers, known to have covered great distances over water, sometimes to escape imprisonment, unlike their counterparts in some other parts of Australia they had no cause to dive in conditions where the tidal range provided all they needed. Many were also succumbing to diseases to which they had not previously been exposed, as well as accidents. This led to recruitment from the convicts on the "Native Prison" on Rottnest Island. Broadhurst was criticised for harsh treatment of at least one indigenous employee, while some pearlers abducted and/or forcibly retained their divers.

Experiments with alternative labour sources and with diving apparatus (The 'Hard Hat' )
In the meantime, 'naked diving' continued with most producing exceptional results, especially at the Flying Foam Passage where they used the tides to allow themselves to travel over great distances. As the demands on the local Aboriginal populations increased, many died due to disease and maltreatment.

The Shark Bay pearling industry   
Frank Cadell was also operating at Shark Bay in this period and in this era 'dredging' rapidly became  the most efficient means of obtaining the shell, which was noted more for the pearls rather than the shell as was the  situation further north. The publicity surrounding the successes resulted in a virtual gold rush centred on  Wilyah Miah (Place of the Pearl).

The Broome era
'Diving apparatus' (standard dress or 'hard hat') was used. Soon the Japanese divers came to dominate the industry. By 1910, nearly 400 pearling luggers and more than 3500 people were fishing for shell in waters around Broome, making it the world's largest pearling centre. The majority of the workers were Japanese and Malaysian, but also included were Chinese, Filipino, Amborese, Koepanger (Timorese) and Makassan, as well as Indigenous Australians and people from Europe.

In 1910, two schooners from Koepang were reported to be at work harvesting beche-de-mer near the Walcott Inlet, within Collier Bay, after a "phantom ship" had been spotted off Cape Farquhar some days before.

By the 1930s, pearl luggers were mainly motorised and the use of mechanical air pumps allowed boats to use two divers.  The industry suffered from a high death toll, with hazards from shark attack, cyclones and frequently, the bends.  Four tropical cyclones hit the area between 1908 and 1935 and over 100 boats and 300 people were lost during that time, as evidenced by the numerous graves in the Japanese cemetery in Broome.

At the time of the World War I the price of mother-of-pearl plummeted with the invention and expanded use of plastics for buttons and other articles which had previously been made of shell. Broome had been the centre of an industry that supplied up to 70% of global demand for the shell.  Concerns regarding over-harvesting by the industry led to the voluntary Northern Territory Pearling Ordinance in 1931. Pearlers such as Jiro Muramats continued to operate out of Cossack.  By 1939 only 73 luggers and 565 people were left in the industry and during the World War II, pearling virtually stopped. Japanese divers discreetly went home or were interned and Broome was bombed, destroying many of the remaining luggers. After the war, as few as 15 boats employing around 200 people remained.

Post WW2: indentured labour
After World War II, workers were brought from Malaya and Indonesia on bonds to work in the pearl shelling industry and returned to their country of origin when no longer needed. Sumatran-born Samsudin bin Katib was a pearl diver who was recruited and deployed in the Z Special Unit Commandos in the Australian Army and worked behind enemy lines. Returning to work in Broome, Samsudin protested at a 10% cut in wages and poor conditions for the migrant labourers, organising a general strike. He also applied to be allowed permanent residence, but this was against the provisions of the White Australia policy. Despite the backing of some unions and individuals, he was deported in 1948.

Legacy of the 19th century

In April 2019, the skeletons of 14 Yawuru and Karajarri people which had been sold in 1894 by a wealthy Broome pastoralist and pearler to a museum in Dresden, Germany, were brought home. The remains, which had been stored in the Grassi Museum of Ethnology in Leipzig, showed signs of head wounds and malnutrition, a reflection of the poor conditions endured by Aboriginal people forced to work on the pearl luggers.

Pearling luggers
The boats used for pearling from the 1870s, known as pearling luggers, were unique to Australia. There were at least two types: the Broome or North-West lugger, and the Thursday Island or Torres Strait lugger. The styles are each adapted to their respective areas and modus operandi. Around Broome, the boats had to cope with the extreme tidal range and the shallow sandy shore, on which they had to spend extended periods lying on their sides. The Torres Strait luggers spent longer periods at sea, based around schooners as mother ships.

The design of these two types changed after the engines were developed for the boats, and over time they began to look more alike. They were some of the last wooden sailing vessels in commercial use in Australia.

Michael Gregg, curator of maritime history at the Western Australian Museum says there were four different types, and also pointed out that the Broome pearling lugger was not actually a lugger. The name derived from the first boats used for pearling in Australia, which were often ship's boats, and used a lugsail, and so they were called luggers. But as boats began to be designed specifically for pearling, they kept the name luggers though they stopped using lugsails, and were actually gaff-rigged ketches.

At the peak of the pearling industry, in the early 1900s, there were 350 to 400 pearling luggers operating out of Broome each year. By 2005, there were just two still afloat in Broome. In 2007, one of them, Ida Lloyd, sank off Cable Beach, and in 2015, Intombi, built in 1903, was burnt. However as of 2019, there were still about 40 luggers of various types still afloat around Australia, and there is a collection of luggers at the Australian National Maritime Museum.

Cultured pearls
Due to the prospect of an adverse reaction in the natural pearling industry, the Australian government through the Pearling Act 1922 prohibited anyone in Australia from artificially producing cultivated pearls. The Act was repealed in 1949. The Japanese-owned Nippo Pearl Company handled distribution and marketing. The principal was Tokuichi Kuribayashi (1896–1982) who became highly influential following the death of Kōkichi Mikimoto (1858–1954). Mikimoto, Kuribayashi and another man, Tatsuhei Mise (1880–1924) had all been involved in the invention of cultured pearls around 1900. Kuri Bay was named after Mr Kuribayashi.

By 1981, there were five pearl farms operational: Kuri Bay, Port Smith, Cygnet Bay, and two in Broome's Roebuck Bay.

The industry today includes 19 of Australia's 20 cultured pearl farms and generates annual exports of  million and employs approximately 1000 people.

See also
Blackbirding
Slavery in Australia
Broome Pearling Lugger Pidgin

References

Further reading

Pearls
Shark Bay
History of fishing
Economic history of Western Australia
Slavery in Australia
Kimberley coastline of Western Australia
Pilbara Coast